Dinamo Krasnodar is a Russian women's volleyball club based in Krasnodar. It was founded in 1946 and plays in the super league, the top Russian league.

History

Soviet years
Founded in 1946, the club participated in the 1946 Soviet Women's Volleyball Championship (National championship) finishing in 11th place (out of 18 teams). From that point, the club competed only at regional level until 1955 when it returned to the National championship remaining there until 1966 when it was relegated to a lower national level. In the years that followed, the club had mixed results being promoted and relegated many times without achieving any real tangible success.

Russian years
The club competed in the "B" league of the Russian Women's Championship in 1992–93 and gained promotion to the Super League. A year later it won its first title, the 1994 Russian Cup. It was relegated after a poor campaign in the 1997–98 Super League where it finished last. It took a decade for the club to return to the Super League, only returning in the 2009–10 season. Since then the club has become consistent and competitive, it qualified for a European competition for the first time, the Women's CEV Cup in 2010–11 reaching the final. On domestic level the club added two more Russian Cups (2014 and 2015). European success soon came in the form of titles in the 2012–13 CEV Challenge Cup and CEV Cups of 2014–15 and 2015–16. In 2015, the club was given a wildcard to participate of the FIVB Volleyball Club World Championship in Switzerland and reached the tournament's final.

Honours

National competitions
  Russian Cup: 3
1994, 2014, 2015

International competitions
  CEV Cup: 2
2014–15, 2015–16

  CEV Challenge Cup: 1
2012–13

Team roster
Season 2018–2019, as of January 2019.

Notable players

  Vera Duyunova
  Nataliya Kudreva
  Valentina Ogienko
  Lyudmila Shchetinina
  Zoya Yusova
  Olga Fateeva
  Tatiana Kosheleva
  Svetlana Kryuchkova
  Yulia Merkulova
  Maria Perepelkina
  Lyubov Sokolova
  Yevgeniya Startseva
  Elena Zarubina
  Natalya Mammadova
  Fabíola de Souza
  Fe Garay
  Rosir Calderón
  Helena Havelková
  Anja Spasojević
  Neriman Özsoy
  Foluke Akinradewo
  Destinee Hooker

References

External links
Dinamo Krasnodar official website 

Russian volleyball clubs
Volleyball clubs established in 1946
1946 establishments in Russia
Sports clubs in Krasnodar